The Moth Diaries is a 2011 gothic horror film written and directed by Mary Harron, based on the 2002 novel of the same name by Rachel Klein. The film stars Lily Cole, Sarah Gadon, Sarah Bolger, Judy Parfitt, and Scott Speedman. The plot follows Rebecca, a teenage girl who suspects that Ernessa, the new student at an all-girls boarding school is a vampire. An Irish-Canadian venture, the film was co-produced by Samson Films and Mediamax.

The Moth Diaries premiered at the 68th Venice International Film Festival on 6 September 2011, and was theatrically released in Canada on 6 April 2012 by Alliance Films and in Ireland on 24 May 2013 by Lionsgate. The film received generally negative reviews from critics.

Plot
At an exclusive boarding school for girls, 16-year-old Rebecca Cantor writes her most intimate thoughts in a diary. Two years earlier, Rebecca's father, a poet, took his own life by slitting his wrists. Her mother transferred Rebecca to the school, hoping to help her daughter escape the memory of her father's death. With the help of her best friend and roommate, Lucy Blake, Rebecca soon recovers.

The following year, a mysterious, dark-haired girl named Ernessa Bloch enrolls into the school. Lucy quickly becomes best friends with Ernessa and becomes distant from Rebecca. Ernessa's presence makes Rebecca feel uneasy. She tries to confront Lucy about Ernessa's dark secrets, but her pleas are dismissed as jealousy. Eerie things start to happen. First, Charley gets expelled because of Ernessa. Dora dies in a freak accident shortly after spying on Ernessa's room, and a teacher is found murdered in the woods. Tension starts to grow at the school.

To Rebecca, Ernessa is an enigma. She seems like she can walk through closed windows, and she is often seen lingering around the basement (a place that students are forbidden to go). Rebecca thinks Ernessa is a vampire.

Ernessa slowly gets rid of Rebecca's close friends, leaving Rebecca to find out what is happening by herself.

A new English teacher, Mr Davies, arrives at the school. Mr Davies shows particular interest in Rebecca. The two share ideas on Romantic literature and poetry. Rebecca soon learns that vampires do not necessarily drink blood, but they can drain the lively spirit out of their victims. Mr Davies addresses himself as a fan of Rebecca's poet father. Rebecca turns to Mr Davies for help, and, during their conversation, the two kiss but Rebecca pulls away.

Lucy is sent to the hospital, but only Rebecca knows that Lucy is sick because of Ernessa. Rebecca tries to convince Lucy that Ernessa is the root of all their problems, but Lucy refuses to listen and profanes at her. She tells Rebecca that she is not the "old Lucy" anymore, and that Rebecca's refusal to see this is what has really spoiled their friendship.  Although Lucy recovers for a couple days, she soon dies after Ernessa completely drains the life out of her.

Ernessa confronts Rebecca in the library and presents her with a sharp razor and elaborates on the pleasure of death. Another time, Ernessa sings a disturbing nursery rhyme about "The Juniper Tree" then slits her own wrists, causing blood to rain down on her and Rebecca. Afterwards, Ernessa and the blood disappear.

Rebecca steals the keys to the basement, and after entering, sees an old suitcase with Ernessa's full name written on it. From an old diary, Rebecca learns that many years ago Ernessa's father also killed himself, and Ernessa, unable to cope with the grief, took her own life thereafter. Rebecca soon learns that Ernessa has wanted Rebecca to kill herself.

Shortly after, Rebecca returns to the basement to discover Ernessa sleeping in the suitcase. Rebecca pours kerosene on Ernessa and around the coffin and lights it before Ernessa wakes up. Rebecca walks outside to see a fire truck present and her classmates standing around. Through a door she sees the ghost of Ernessa, who slowly turns around and walks into the sun before vanishing.

Knowing the authorities are suspicious of her, Rebecca is certain that Ernessa will not have left any remains. During the ride to the police station she pulls a razor blade out of her diary and drops it out of the window, staring blankly into the distance.

Cast

 Sarah Bolger as Rebecca Cantor
 Lily Cole as Ernessa Bloch
 Sarah Gadon as Lucy Blake
 Judy Parfitt as Mrs. Rood
 Melissa Farman as Dora
 Laurence Hamelin as Sofia
 Gia Sandhu as Kiki
 Valerie Tian as Charley
 Scott Speedman as Mr. Davies

Release
The film was shown Out of Competition at the 68th Venice International Film Festival.

Critical reception
The Moth Diaries received primarily negative reviews from critics. On Rotten Tomatoes, the film has a rating of 14%, based on 46 reviews. On Metacritic, it received a score of 38 out of 100, based on 13 critics, indicating "generally unfavorable reviews". Neil Young of The Hollywood Reporter criticised the films lack of narrative suspense and overall inert storytelling, stating that "The Moth Diaries is about as scary and menacing as the harmless lepidoptera in the film’s title."

On 4 May 2015, Scout Tafoya of RogerEbert.com included the film in his video series "The Unloved", where he highlights films which received mixed to negative reviews yet he believes to have artistic value. He stated that "unlike other young-adult adaptations, the ritual and hardship of being in high school is never edged out by the supernatural goings-on; Rebecca and her friends worry about boys and grades as much as vampires ... Harron was attempting to communicate honestly with teens and pre-teen girls, to make a movie with characters and situations they might recognize." Tafoya further added, "Where the world refuses to stop turning just because crisis mounts for one girl, and thanks to a careless if not downright malicious marketing and distribution strategy, its audience never got a chance to watch it alongside Twilight sequels or Marvel movies ... The film industry is only just learning it can't get away with ignoring women of all ages."

References

External links
 IFC Films official site
 
 
 
 
 

2011 films
2011 horror films
2011 LGBT-related films
2010s mystery horror films
2010s supernatural horror films
2010s teen horror films
Films set in boarding schools
Canadian LGBT-related films
Canadian mystery films
Canadian supernatural horror films
Canadian teen films
Canadian vampire films
English-language Canadian films
English-language Irish films
Films about suicide
Films based on American horror novels
Films directed by Mary Harron
Films scored by Lesley Barber
Films shot in Montreal
Gothic horror films
Irish LGBT-related films
Irish mystery films
Irish supernatural horror films
Irish teen horror films
LGBT-related horror films
Teen mystery films
2010s English-language films
2010s Canadian films